Giovanni Battista Ramenghi (1521, Bologna - 1601, Bologna) was an Italian painter. He is sometimes known as Bagnacavallo junior or Bagnacavallo the Younger to distinguish him from his father Bartolomeo Ramenghi (known as Bagnacavallo).

Life
He trained in his father's studio and accompanied Primaticcio on his trip to France, where he was influenced for a time by the Fontainebleau School. Working to meet the strictures of the Counter-Reformation, Ramenghi was one of the most conservative painters of the Bolognese school of the time, moving on from Raphael but refusing to be influenced by the early work of the young Annibale Carracci

Works
 Incredulity of St Thomas, Chiesa dei San Girolamo, Bagnacavallo
 Rosario Altarpiece, Chiesa del Carmine, Bagnacavallo
 Sacra Conversazione with Saints Dominic and Catherine of Siena, Museo civico delle Capuccine, Bagnacavallo
 Madonna and Child with the Infant St John the Baptist, St Catherine of Alexandria and Saint Dominic, Pinacoteca civica di Forlì
 Madonna and Child with Saints John the Baptist, John the Evangelist, Francis, Clare, Catherine and Mary Magdalene (signed and dated to 1563), Pinacoteca Nazionale di Bologna 
 Crucifixion with Saint John the Evangelist, Saint Mary Magdalene and Saint Luke, Civitella di Romagna, Santuario della Madonna della Suasia
 Crucifixion with the Madonna and Three Saints, Bologna, Chiesa di Sant'Isaia
 The Mystic Marriage of St Catherine, Musée Jeanne d'Aboville (La Fère, France)

References

1521 births
1601 deaths
Painters from Bologna
16th-century Italian painters